The Grand Duchy of Tuscany was founded in 1569. It succeeded the Duchy of Florence. The grand duchy was initially ruled by the House of Medici, until their extinction in 1737. The grand duchy passed to the House of Lorraine, and then, to its cadet branch, the House of Habsburg-Lorraine. The House of Habsburg Lorraine ruled Tuscany from 1765 to 1801, and then 1814 to 1859.
A reigning grand duchess was styled:
 (1569–1691) Her Highness The Grand Duchess of Tuscany
 (1691–1737) Her Royal Highness The Most Serene Grand Duchess of Tuscany
 (1737–1765) Her Imperial Majesty Holy Roman Empress, the Queen of Hungary and Bohemia, the Archduchess of Austria, the Most Serene Grand Duchess of Tuscany, etc.
 (1765–1804) Her Royal Highness The Most Serene Grand Duchess of Tuscany, Archduchess of Austria, etc.
 (1804–1859) Her Imperial and Royal Highness The Most Serene Grand Duchess of Tuscany, Archduchess of Austria, etc.

Margravine of Tuscany

House of Bonifacii, 812–931

House of Arles, 931–1001

House of Bologna, 1004–1011 

 Interregnum 1011–1014

House of ?, 1014–1027

House of Canossa, 1027–1115 

 Interregnum 1115–1120

House of Scheiern, 1120–1127 

 Interregnum 1127–1135

House of Sponheim, 1135–1137 
None

House of Welf, 1137–1139

House of Attems, 1139–1152

House of Welf, 1152–1173 

 Interregnum 1173–1195

House of Hohenstaufen, 1195–1197

Consorts of the Lords of Florence

House of Medici, 1434–1531

Duchess of Florence

House of Medici, 1531–1569

Grand Duchess of Tuscany

House of Medici, 1569–1737 

The Medici became extinct in 1737. Francis Stpehen, Duke of Lorraine acceded the grand-ducal throne.

House of Lorraine, 1737–1765

House of Habsburg-Lorraine, 1765–1801 

The House of Habsburg-Lorraine was deposed by the Treaty of Aranjuez in 1801. The House of Bourbon-Parma ruled over Tuscany in the form of the Kingdom of Etruria until their own deposition by forces of Napoleon Bonaparte in 1807.

Elisa Bonaparte become Duchess of her ancestral homeland in 1809 by appointment from her own second older brother and King of Italy, Napoleon himself.

Queen of Etruria

House of Bourbon-Parma, 1801–1807

Grand Duchess of Tuscany

House of Habsburg-Lorraine, 1814–1859 
The Habsburgs were restored by the Congress of Vienna in 1814.

Tuscany was annexed to the United Provinces of Central Italy in 1859, and then absorbed into the Kingdom of Sardinia in 1860.

Titular Grand Duchesses, 1868–2013

See also 
 List of rulers of Tuscany
 List of consorts of Urbino
 List of Parmese consorts
 List of Savoyard consorts
 List of consorts of Montferrat
 List of Sardinian consorts
 List of Sicilian consorts
 List of Neapolitan consorts
 List of consorts of the Two Sicilies
 List of Italian consorts
 Grand Duchy of Tuscany
 Grand Princesses of Tuscany

Notes 

House of Medici
 
Tuscany
Duchesses of Florence
Tuscany, List of royal consorts of